The 1983 South African Grand Prix was a Formula One motor race held at Kyalami on 15 October 1983. It was the fifteenth and final race of the 1983 Formula One season.

Race summary 
Before the race, three drivers were still in a position to win the World Drivers' Championship: Alain Prost (Renault) led the championship with 57 points, followed by Nelson Piquet (Brabham-BMW) with 55 and René Arnoux (Ferrari) with 49. Piquet qualified second, behind Patrick Tambay (Ferrari) in pole position and ahead of Riccardo Patrese (Brabham), Arnoux and Prost in third, fourth and fifth. At the start Piquet passed Tambay to take the lead, with Patrese moving into second place.  Arnoux retired with engine failure on lap 9. Prost fought his way up to third place, but he also retired on lap 35 with turbo failure. Needing only to finish fourth or higher, Piquet slowed and was overtaken by Patrese, Niki Lauda (McLaren) and Andrea de Cesaris (Alfa Romeo). Lauda's engine failed on lap 71. The race finished with Patrese in first place, de Cesaris in second and Piquet in third, and Piquet won the championship by two points. Ferrari won the Constructors' Championship despite not finishing in the points in the last race for the second consecutive year. John Watson, completing his last full Formula One season, was disqualified for overtaking other cars on the parade lap.

Classification

Qualifying

Race

Championship permutations 
 Alain Prost (57pts) needed either
 1st
 2nd, ahead of Piquet
 3rd, with Piquet 2nd or lower
 4th or 5th, with Piquet 3rd or lower
 6th, with Piquet 4th or lower and Arnoux 2nd or lower
 Piquet 5th or lower and Arnoux 2nd or lower
 Nelson Piquet (55pts)
 1st
 2nd, with Prost 4th or lower
 3rd, with Prost 6th or lower
 4th, with Prost 7th or lower and Arnoux 2nd or lower
 René Arnoux (49pts) needed 1st with Prost 6th or lower and Piquet 4th or lower

 Ferrari and Renault were also fighting for the Constructor's Championship
 Ferrari (89pts) needed either
 To score 5pts or better
 4th, or 5th and 6th, or higher, with the Renaults 1st and 3rd or lower
 5th or better, with the Renaults 1st and 4th or lower
 6th or better, with the Renaults 1st and 5th or lower
 The Renaults scoring fewer than 11pts
 Renault (78pts) needed either
 1st and 2nd with the Ferraris scoring fewer than 5pts
 1st and 3rd with the Ferraris scoring fewer than 3pts
 1st and 4th with the Ferraris 6th or lower
 1st and 5th with the Ferraris 7th or lower.

Championship standings after the race

Drivers' Championship standings

Constructors' Championship standings

References

External links
 1983 South African Grand Prix at Grandprix.com

South African Grand Prix
South African Grand Prix
Grand Prix
October 1983 sports events in Africa